Stratton Library may refer to:

Stratton Library, at Sheldon Jackson College
Stratton Library, in the Cobb County Public Library System